The C.L. Smith & Son General Store is a historic commercial building on Arkansas Highway 66, opposite the courthouse square, in central Mountain View, Arkansas.  It is a single-story stone structure, with vernacular Romanesque styling consisting of round-arch window openings flanking a similar entry opening.  The front facade is topped by a parapet, which obscures the flat roof, and is stepped down the east side. The store was built in 1905, and is one of the early stone buildings that typify the city center's architecture.

The building was listed on the National Register of Historic Places in 1985.

See also
National Register of Historic Places listings in Stone County, Arkansas

References

Commercial buildings on the National Register of Historic Places in Arkansas
Romanesque Revival architecture in Arkansas
Commercial buildings completed in 1905
Buildings and structures in Mountain View, Arkansas
National Register of Historic Places in Stone County, Arkansas
1905 establishments in Arkansas